Robert Alexander Boyce (born 7 January 1974) is an English former footballer who played as a midfielder in the Football League for Colchester United.

Career

Born in Islington, London, Boyce began his career with Sheffield Wednesday, although he made no first-team appearances for the club. He then joined Enfield and appeared for Stevenage Borough on trial prior to joining Colchester United in 1995.

Boyce made his debut for Colchester in a 2–1 victory over Cardiff City at Ninian Park on 28 October 1995, coming on as a substitute for Steve Mardenborough. His final appearance came during a 3–2 away defeat at Doncaster Rovers on 18 November 1995, again as a substitute.

Upon leaving Colchester, Boyce joined Essex neighbours Chelmsford City. In 1996, he made two substitute league appearances and played one cup game for Aylesbury United and also played for Wealdstone during the 2000–01 season.

References

External links

1974 births
Living people
Footballers from Islington (district)
English footballers
Association football midfielders
Sheffield Wednesday F.C. players
Stevenage F.C. players
Enfield F.C. players
Colchester United F.C. players
Chelmsford City F.C. players
Aylesbury United F.C. players
Wealdstone F.C. players
English Football League players